Zacco chengtui is a species of cyprinid of the genus Zacco. It inhabits Chengtu, Szechman Province, China. It was described in 1934 by Shigeru Kimura, has not been classified on the IUCN Red List and is considered harmless to humans.

References

Cyprinid fish of Asia
Freshwater fish of China
[Category:Taxa named by Shigeru Kimura]]
Fish described in 1934